() is the technique and the social event of having or attending a barbecue in various South American countries, especially Argentina, Chile, Paraguay and Uruguay where it is also a traditional event. Usually, red wine and side dishes such as salads accompany the main meats, which are prepared by a designated cook called the asador or parrillero.

History
Large herds of wild cattle roamed much of the pampa region of Argentina until the mid-nineteenth century. Inhabitants of the Río de la Plata, especially the equestrian gaucho, developed a fondness for beef, especially asado, which is roasted beef (or lamb or goat). The meat, often a side of ribs, is skewered on a metal frame called an asador and is roasted by placing it next to a slow-burning fire. Gauchos favored cooking asado with the wood of the quebracho tree because it smokes very little. Asado, accompanied by mate, formed the basis of the gaucho diet.

Coal and fire

Usually the asador begins by igniting the charcoal, which is often made of native trees, avoiding pines and eucalyptus as they have strong-smelling resins. In more sophisticated asados the charcoal is of a specific tree or made on the coal of recently burned wood, which is also commonplace when having an asado in a campfire. In Uruguay, charcoal is not used, but instead direct embers or hot coals.

Cooking can be done al asador or a la parrilla. In the first case, a fire is lit on the ground or in a fire pit and surrounded by metal crosses (asadores) that hold the entire carcass of an animal splayed open to receive the heat from the fire. In the second case, a fire is made and after the charcoal has formed, a grill with the meat is placed over it.

Embutidos and achuras
In many asados, chorizos, morcillas (black pudding), chinchulines (cow chitterlings), mollejas (sweetbreads), and other organs, often accompanied by provoleta, would be served first while the cuts that require longer preparations are still on the grill. Sometimes these are served on a charcoal brasero. Chorizos may be served with pan felipe or baguette bread, often called choripán.

Meats

After appetizers, costillas or asado de tira (ribs) can be served. Dishes such as pamplona, pork, and Patagonian lamb are becoming more frequent, particularly in restaurants. An asado also includes bread, a simple mixed salad of, for instance, lettuce, tomato, and onions, or it could be accompanied with verdurajo (grilled vegetables), a mixture made of potatoes, corn, onion, and eggplant cooked on the grill and seasoned with olive oil and salt. Beer, wine, soft drink, and other beverages are common. Dessert is usually fresh fruit.

Another traditional form to mainly roast the meat, used in Patagonia, is with the whole animal (especially lamb and pork) in a wood stick nailed in the ground and exposed to the heat of live coals, called asado al palo.

The meat for an asado is not marinated, the only preparation being the application of salt before or during the cooking period. Also, the heat and distance from the coals are controlled to provide a slow cooking; it usually takes around two hours to cook asado. Further, grease from the meat is not encouraged to fall on the coals and create smoke which would adversely flavour the meat. In some asados the area directly under the meat is kept clear of coals.

The asado is usually placed in a tray to be immediately served, but it can also be placed on a brasero right on the table to keep the meat warm. Chimichurri, a sauce of chopped parsley, dried oregano, garlic, salt, black pepper, onion, and paprika with olive oil, or salsa criolla, a sauce of tomato and onion in vinegar, are common accompaniments to an asado, where they are traditionally used on the offal, but not the steaks.

Salad
Food is often accompanied by salads, which in asado gatherings are traditionally made by women on site or brought to the asado from their homes while the men focus on the meats. Salad Olivier (ensalada rusa) is one of the most common salads served at asados. In Paraguay chipa guasu, sopa paraguaya and boiled manioc as a side dish are also served.

Variations

In Chile, the normal version cordero al palo (whole roast lamb) is usually accompanied with pebre, a local condiment made from pureed herbs, garlic, and hot peppers, in many ways similar to chimichurri. The dish is typical of southern Chile and is served hot accompanied by salads. A whole lamb is tied to a spit and is then roasted perpendicular on a wood fire. The preparation lasts around 5 hours since cooking must be constant and on a low heat.

In Brazil, asado is called , although the cooking is usually faster. Grilled and salted meat in Brazil is generally called "carne assada" and is often cut into small strips and served on a plate or cutting board in the middle of the table for all to partake. Various grilled meats, pork, sausages and occasionally chicken are also passed around from table to table on a spit and a slice is offered to each person. This is called "rodizio" because each person partakes in turn. Charcoal is predominantly used instead of embers of wood, and Brazilians tend to cook the meat on skewers or grills. The meat of Rozidio is usually seasoned with salt alone.

In Mexico, there is similar tradition of as parrilladas or carne asadas, which incorporates various marinated cuts of meat, including steaks, chicken, and sausages (chorizo, longaniza, and moronga being especially popular). These are all grilled over wood charcoal. Vegetables are also placed over the grill, especially green onions (cebollitas), nopales, and corn (elote).

Again, in Argentina, Uruguay, and Paraguay, some alternatives are the asado al disco and asado al horno de barro, especially in the countryside. The recipe does not change, only the way of cooking. In the asado al disco (the worn-out disc of a plough) is used. Being metallic and concave, three or four metallic legs are welded and with hot coal or lumber below it is easily transformed into an effective grill. Food is put in a spiral, in such a way that the fat naturally slips to the center, preserving the meat for being fried. Bell peppers and onions are usually put next to the edge, so that they gradually release their juices on the meat. The asado al horno de barro differs from tradition, as an adobe horno (oven, called tatakua in Paraguay) is used. These ovens are a common view in Argentine and Paraguayan estancias; their primary function is to bake bread, chipa guasu and sopa paraguaya, but they are well suited for roasting meat. Pork suckling and, less commonly, lamb are served, as they are more unlikely to become dry.
Another way of cooking the asado is inside a chulengo, an oil barrel (or similar) cut in half, inside which the grill is placed to protect both the meat and fire from heavy winds. This makes the chulengo especially useful in the Patagonia, although it is also used in other areas for practicality and the ability to move it around.

Similar terms in other cuisines
The equivalent of Latin American asado barbecues in Philippine cuisine would be the various inihaw dishes (also known as sinugba or inasal).

In Portugal, a roasted fish dish served with sausages and bacon is also known as assado.

In Goa, roast beef is called assad, from Portuguese assado.

In South Africa, a whole meat carcass cooked with the al asador method is called asado spit braai or spit roast.

See also

 List of barbecue dishes
 Argentine cuisine
 Argentine beef
 Chilean cuisine
 Paraguayan cuisine
 Uruguayan cuisine
 Cuisine of Montevideo

References

External links 
 
 The Art of Cordero al Palo 

Barbecue
National symbols of Argentina
Eating parties
Food and drink in South America
Latin American pork dishes